Rodrigo Andreis Galvão ( Rodrigo, born November 5, 1978 in São Leopoldo, Rio Grande do Sul, Brazil), also known as Rodrigo, is a Brazilian footballer, who is currently playing for Tarxien Rainbows F.C. Rodrigo has a high profile with previous experience in big clubs in Brazil. In 2007–2008, he was named as the Top Scorer of the Hong Kong Top Professional League, scoring 18 goals. After that experience, he left for ABC, which is a highly renomated team in Brazil and he also did well there, where he was a first team important player. At the beginning of the 2011–2012 season, Rodrigo flattered interest from Tarxien Rainbows F.C. from the Maltese Premier League and after some discussions, an agreement was reached between both parties to seal a one-year contract with the Rainbows.

Honours

With Eastern AA:
Hong Kong Senior Shield: 2007-08

References

External links
Rodrigo Andreis Galvão at HKFA
Profile at CBFNEWS.com 

1978 births
Living people
Brazilian footballers
Brazilian expatriate footballers
Association football forwards
F.C. Marco players
Eastern Sports Club footballers
Hong Kong First Division League players
Expatriate footballers in Hong Kong
Brazilian expatriate sportspeople in Hong Kong